The 1991 Alabama Crimson Tide football team represented the University of Alabama in the 1991 NCAA Division I-A football season. The team was led by head coach Gene Stallings who was in his second season at Alabama. The team played their home games at Bryant–Denny Stadium, in Tuscaloosa, Alabama, and at Legion Field in Birmingham, Alabama. The team competed in the Southeastern Conference.

The team improved upon a 7–5 record from Stallings's first season as they ended with an 11–1 overall record, while going 6–1 in their conference games. The September 21st win against Georgia would prove to be the first in a school record tying 28-game winning streak and a school record 31-game unbeaten streak.

Summary
In the opener against Temple, Chris Anderson had a 96-yard touchdown run from scrimmage, setting an all-time team record that still stands.  One week later, Alabama traveled to Florida and got blown out, 35–0.  It was the worst Tide loss in 34 years, since a 40–0 loss in 1957 to Auburn that ended the disastrous coaching tenure of J.B. Whitworth.  It also cost Alabama an SEC title as the Gators went undefeated in conference play.  However, it would be the last game Alabama lost until November 1993, as the next week's 10–0 victory over Georgia began a 28-game winning streak.

After lopsided victories over Vanderbilt, Chattanooga, and Tulane, the Tide started winning a series of squeakers.  Against Tennessee the Tide trailed 6–3 in the fourth quarter when starting quarterback Danny Woodson left the game with a strained hamstring.  Behind backup Jay Barker, Alabama rallied for three touchdowns in the fourth quarter and won 24–19.  It was the Crimson Tide's sixth victory in a row in the Third Saturday in October rivalry.  Barker assumed the starting job when Woodson was suspended for violating team rules before the LSU game.

Late in the fourth quarter of the Mississippi State game, the Bulldogs drove down to the Alabama 1, but Stacy Harrison's end-zone interception preserved a 13–7 victory.  Against LSU, David Palmer ran a punt back 90 yards for a touchdown and Antonio London blocked a field goal with 2:39 to go to preserve a 20–17 Alabama victory.  Bama eked out a 10–7 victory over lowly Memphis State after the Memphis kicker missed two second-half field goals and Alabama end John Copeland forced a fumble by the Memphis quarterback at the Tide 27 with 3:51 to go.  The season ended with Alabama's fifth straight victory by six points or less, as the Tide defeated Auburn in the Iron Bowl 13–6.  Alabama faced off against Colorado in the Blockbuster Bowl and won another nailbiter 30–25 behind a punt return TD and 146 all-purpose yards from Palmer.  Alabama's 11–1 record was its best since the 1979 team went 12–0 and won the national championship.

Schedule

Source: Rolltide.com: 1991 Alabama football schedule

Rankings

Roster

Regular season statistics 
Source:

Overall

Scoring

Passing

References

Alabama
Alabama Crimson Tide football seasons
Cheez-It Bowl champion seasons
Alabama Crimson Tide football